Alexa-Jeanne Dubé (1982?; Montreal) is a Canadian actress and film director. She is most noted as a two-time Prix Iris nominee for Best Live Action Short Film, receiving nods at the 22nd Quebec Cinema Awards in 2020 for BKS (SDR), and at the 24th Quebec Cinema Awards in 2022 for Joutel.

As an actress she is most noted for the web series Féminin/Féminin, for which she was a Gémeaux Award nominee for Best Actress in a Web Series in 2015.

She is the sister of electronic musician Christophe "CRi" Dubé, and directed the music video for his 2020 single "Never Really Get There".

References

External links

21st-century Canadian actresses
21st-century Canadian screenwriters
21st-century Canadian women writers
Canadian film actresses
Canadian television actresses
Canadian web series actresses
Canadian women screenwriters
Canadian screenwriters in French
Canadian music video directors
Actresses from Quebec
Film directors from Quebec
Writers from Quebec
Living people
1982 births